Hai Qing (born 12 January 1978) is a Chinese film and television actress who has appeared in such films as Finding Mr. Right, Operation Red Sea and Sacrifice. For her role in the 2009 television series A Beautiful Daughter-in-law Era she was nominated for numerous TV awards including a Flying Apsaras Awards for Best Actress and a Golden Eagle Award for Best Actress which she both won. In 2015 Hai became the first UN Women National Ambassador for China
Hai Qing ranked 36th on Forbes China Celebrity 100 list in 2013, 46th in 2014, and 57th in 2015.

Biography
Hai was born in 1978 in Gulou District, Nanjing. She began acting at the age of seven appearing in television shows before joining the Jiangsu Provincial Theater School at age twelve. In 1997 she was accepted into the Beijing Film Academy and shortly afterwards appeared in her first feature film Jade Goddess of Mercy. Hai returned to the small screen a few years later to appear in a number of supporting role before joining what was to become her best known role in the show A Beautiful Daughter-in-law Era. As the character Guo Hai-ping, Hai went on to receive three award nominations; two at the Golden Eagle Awards and one at the Feitian Television Awards.

In 2015, while attending a United Nations HeForShe banquet Hai was appointed as the first goodwill ambassador for China by Assistant Secretary-General Lakshmi Puri. In her role as an ambassador, she became involved in the UN's Step It Up For Gender Equality campaign to end violence against women and help empower women in China.

Filmography 
 Return to Dust (2022)
 In Winter (2019)
 Operation Red Sea (2018)
 What a Wonderful Family (2017)
 Finding Mr. Right (2013)
 Love Is... Pyjamas (2012)

Awards and nominations

References

External links

Living people
1978 births
Actresses from Nanjing
Beijing Film Academy alumni
21st-century Chinese actresses